The 2022 Kwik Fit British Touring Car Championship (commonly abbreviated as BTCC) was a motor racing championship for production-based touring cars held across England and Scotland. The championship featured a mix of professional motor racing teams and privately funded amateur drivers competing in highly modified versions of family cars which are sold to the general public and conform to the technical regulations for the championship. The 2022 season was the 65th British Touring Car Championship season and the twelfth season for cars conforming to the Next Generation Touring Car (NGTC) technical specification.
 
Tom Ingram won the championship, his first championship in the BTCC.

Teams and drivers

Driver changes 
Entering/re-entering BTCC
 Dexter Patterson debuted with Laser Tools Racing.
 George Gamble debuted with Car Gods with Ciceley Motorsport.
 2020 Jack Sears Trophy winner Michael Crees returned to the series after he split with BTC Racing at the start of last season, driving a first car for Power Maxed Racing to replace Dan Lloyd.
 2017 VW Racing Cup winner Bobby Thompson returned to the series and Team HARD after having last raced in 2020 for GKR TradePriceCars.com.
 Rob Collard's son Ricky Collard returned to the series after having last raced in 2018 for Team BMW, driving a second car for Toyota Gazoo Racing UK to replace Sam Smelt.
 2019 British GT4 Championship winner Ash Hand debuted with Power Maxed Racing.
 2021 Britcar Endurance Championship winner Will Powell debuted with Autobrite Direct with JourneyHero to replace Jack Goff.
Changed teams
 Dan Cammish will move from BTC Racing to Motorbase Performance, driving for the "NAPA Racing UK" branded team.
 Reigning Champion Ashley Sutton will move from Laser Tools Racing to Motorbase Performance, racing for the "NAPA Racing UK" brand.
 Dan Lloyd will move from Adrian Flux with Power Maxed Racing to Excelr8 Motorsport.
 Tom Chilton will move from Car Gods with Ciceley Motorsport to Excelr8 Motorsport.
 Rick Parfitt Jr. will move from Excelr8 with TradePriceCars.com to Team HARD.
 Jason Plato will move from Adrian Flux with Power Maxed Racing to BTC Racing.
Leaving BTCC
 Tom Oliphant will take a sabbatical from the series.
 Andy Neate retired from the series in order to focus on his son's racing career.
 Senna Proctor will take a sabbatical from the series.
 Chris Smiley will leave the series and join the 2022 TCR UK Touring Car Championship.
 Jack Mitchell will leave the series and rejoin the 2022 British GT Championship.
 Sam Smelt will take a sabbatical from the series.
 Carl Boardley will retire from the series.
 Jack Goff was set for his fourth season with Tony Gilham Racing, but withdrew before the season began.

Team changes 
 MB Motorsport will move from Motorbase Performance to West Surrey Racing.
 Motorbase Performance, will enter 2 cars under the commercial name of NAPA Racing UK following its sponsorship by the European division of Genuine Parts Company.
 Excelr8 Motorsport will use Hyundai engines tuned by Swindon Powertrain.
 Excelr8 Motorsport and Team Dynamics will enter the Manufacturers'/Constructors' Championship as constructors.

Race calendar
The championship calendar was announced by the championship organisers on 30 June 2021.

Results and standings
All drivers raced under British licenses, except Árón Taylor-Smith, who raced with an Irish license.

Drivers' Championship

Notes
The point for leading laps in race is one point, regardless of how many laps led, except that the driver who leads the most laps earns the bonus point.

Manufacturers'/Constructors' Championship

Teams' Championship

Independents' Trophy

Independent Teams' Trophy

Jack Sears Trophy

Goodyear Wingfoot Award
{|
|valign="top"|

References

External links 

 
 TouringCarTimes

British Touring Car Championship seasons
Touring Car Championship